Vice Admiral Andries Petrus Putter  (2 December 1935 – 17 July 2014) was a South African military commander who served as Chief of the South African Navy twice, first from 1982 to 1985 and again from 1989 to 1990. He was born in Brits in 1935.

Military career 
He joined the Navy in 1954 He completed a year’s training at the Saldanha Naval Gymnasium in the same year. He completed a Bachelor of Science Degree through the University of Stellenbosch, as the Military Academy had not yet been established. He attended a torpedo anti-submarine course England, before joining the Frigate SAS President Kruger as a torpedo anti-submarine officer.
In 1982 he was appointed Chief of Naval Staff Operations and in 1985 as the Chief of the Navy.

In 1985 he was appointed as Chief of Defence Intelligence and in 1989 was appointed Chief of the Navy again. Following the Border War, the Navy budget was drastically reduced and Putter made the decision to retrench a large number of personnel. 
He retired from the Navy shortly afterwards in 1990. He died at the Bayview Hospital in Mossel Bay on 17 July 2014.

Awards and decorations

See also
List of South African military chiefs

References

|-

|-

|-

1935 births
South African admirals
White South African people
South African military personnel of the Border War
Chiefs of the South African Navy
2014 deaths
Stellenbosch University alumni